The modest tiger parrot (Psittacella modesta) is a species of parrot in the family Psittaculidae.
It is found in the Arfak Mountains and New Guinea Highlands.
Its natural habitat is subtropical or tropical moist montane forests.

References

modest tiger parrot
Birds of New Guinea
Endemic fauna of New Guinea
Least concern biota of Oceania
modest tiger parrot
Taxonomy articles created by Polbot